Consort Jin may refer to:

Imperial consorts with the surname Jin
 Jin Yueguang ( 315) and Jin Yuehua ( 315–318), two of Liu Cong's later empresses
 Empress Jin (Yin) ( 318), wife of the Han Zhao emperor Liu Can
 Jin Feishan (died 926), wife of the Former Shu emperor Wang Yan
 Lady Jin ( 933–935), wife of the Min emperor Wang Yanjun

Imperial consorts with the title Consort Jin
Imperial Noble Consort Dunhui (1856–1933), concubine of the Tongzhi Emperor
Imperial Noble Consort Wenjing (1873–1924), concubine of the Guangxu Emperor